Rowena Sanchez Arrieta (born 1962) is a Filipina pianist.

Biography
At 19, Arrieta won fifth place and title of Laureate at the VII Tchaikovsky International Piano Competition in Moscow and special prize for being the “youngest and most promising contestant” among 82 pianists and is the only Filipino that has attained this honor. Subsequently, she won 1st Prize at the 1986 José Iturbi Competition in Valencia, Spain and 1st Prize at the 1986 the Frinna Awerbuch International Competition in New York.

She became the first Filipino scholar at the Moscow Conservatory of Music in 1979 where she obtained her master's degree. She graduated in 1985 with highest honors (western equivalent of summa cum laude.) She did her professional studies at the Manhattan School of Music, where she was also a full scholar.

The New York Times described her playing as having a "fevered, demonic intensity" and "a gentle, sublime introspection." US Daily News called her a "combination of purity and fire." Rowena has performed in various cities of the former Soviet Union, France, Spain, Germany, Italy, Australia, Hong Kong, United States, and her native Philippines. She played as soloist of the Moscow Radio-TV Orchestra, Orquestaa de Radio Television Espana, Valencia Symphony Orchestra, Manhattan Philharmonia, California Symphony Orchestra, Chicago Symphony Orchestra and the Philippine Philharmonic Orchestra. Her other awards include the Ten Outstanding Women in National Service (Philippines, 1989), Presidential Awards in Performance (Philippines, 1978-1979) and 2nd prize as songwriter/lyricist in the 1979 Metro pop Music Festival (Philippines).

References

Further reading
 
 

Filipino classical pianists
Women classical pianists
José Iturbi International Piano Competition prize-winners
Keyboardists
Living people
1962 births
Manhattan School of Music alumni
Moscow Conservatory alumni
21st-century classical pianists